Roy Douglas "DD" Moore (June 8, 1921 – May 12, 2014) was an American football and basketball coach.

Early life
Moore was born in Charlotte, North Carolina in 1921 and attended North Carolina College from 1940, where he played football. After serving as a lieutenant in a United States Army radar unit during World War II, he resumed his education and graduated as a Bachelor of Science in 1947. He studied at the University of Illinois at Urbana–Champaign, receiving an MS in 1948 and a PhD in 1967.

Coaching career
Moore became football and basketball coach at St. Augustine's College in 1948. He was Central Intercollegiate Athletic Association (CIAA) Football Coach of the Year in 1950 and 1953 CIAA Basketball Coach of the Year. He served as the head football coach at South Carolina State College—now known as South Carolina State University—from 1955 to 1959 and Delaware State College—now known as Delaware State University—from 1960 to 1964. His record was 20–13–1 at South Carolina State and 19–24–1 at Delaware State.

Moore led the Health, Physical Education and Recreational Department at North Carolina A&T State University for 20 years, retiring in 1986.

Honors
Moore was inducted into the CIAA Hall of Fame in 2004. In 2013, he was honored in the House of Representatives for his community work by Congress member Mel Watt.

Head coaching record

References

External links
 

1921 births
2014 deaths
Delaware State Hornets football coaches
North Carolina Central Eagles football players
South Carolina State Bulldogs football coaches
St. Augustine's Falcons football coaches
St. Augustine's Falcons men's basketball coaches
University of Illinois Urbana-Champaign alumni
United States Army officers
United States Army personnel of World War II
Sportspeople from Charlotte, North Carolina
Coaches of American football from North Carolina
Players of American football from North Carolina
Basketball coaches from North Carolina
African-American coaches of American football
African-American players of American football
African-American basketball coaches
20th-century African-American sportspeople
21st-century African-American sportspeople